The Sixty-eighth Colorado General Assembly was the meeting of the legislative branch of the State of Colorado, from January 12, 2011 until January 9, 2013.  In the 2010 midterm elections, the Republican Party won a slim majority in the Colorado House of Representatives, while the Democratic Party kept their majority in the Colorado Senate.

Major events and legislation

Change in partisan balance
Republican victories in the 2010 midterm elections resulted in a one-seat majority in the Colorado House. Three centrist Democrats from swing districts—Joe Rice, Sara Gagliardi, and Dianne Primavera—who had brokered bipartisan agreements in the 67th Colorado General Assembly were replaced by Republican challengers, leading to early fears of partisan gridlock.  However, the two-year-long 33-34 partisan division also resulted in numerous temporary coalitions, prompting the Denver Post to editorialize in 2012 that "on balance, this year's regular session of the legislature was a success."

Budgetary measures
The primary constitutional duty of the General Assembly is to pass an annual appropriations measure. Frequently called "the budget" by the press or "the long bill" by legislative staffers (owing to its enormous number of pages and considerable complexity), the annual appropriation is one of the most-watched measures in any given session. The bill is drafted by the Joint Budget Committee (JBC), which is a bipartisan committee made up of House and Senate members and advised by staffers and economists.

SB11-209 was the 2011-2012 budget, passed by the 68th General Assembly in April 2011. It made an appropriation of $18 billion, of which $7 billion was from the state's General Fund. The state's governor, John Hickenlooper, vetoed several sections of the budget measure, arguing that the legislature had overstepped its constitutional authority by making staffing decisions in the bill. The House and Senate overrode the partial vetoes on May 11, 2011.

HB12-1335 was the 2012-2013 budget passed by the 68th General Assembly in late April 2012. The bill made a total appropriation of $20 billion, of which $7.7 billion was from the state's General Fund. Because of ongoing bipartisan agreements in the legislature, the measure achieved the broadest support and highest number of "yes" votes of any Colorado budget since 1995.

2012 Special session
The 68th Colorado General Assembly was also noteworthy for having a Special Session, the first since 2006.

On the second-to-last day of the 2012 legislative session, Speaker of the House Frank McNulty and a group of Republican legislators engaged in a parliamentary filibuster intended to prevent an up-or-down vote on a civil unions bill.  At the time, it was reported that a majority of the House, including five Republicans, supported the measure.  Delaying the civil union bill until adjournment resulted in the bill's expiration.  However, this action also resulted in 30 unrelated bills dying without a floor vote.  The delay resulted in nationwide media attention and triggered a special legislative session which cost taxpayers an estimated $23,500 per day.

In the first special session of the 68th General Assembly, Speaker McNulty assigned the civil unions bill to the State, Veterans and Military Affairs Committee which functioned as a "kill committee," permanently avoiding a vote by the House.  Most remaining measures followed normal procedures, however.

Composition of Senate during 68th Colorado General Assembly

Leadership

Members of the Colorado Senate

Composition of the House during 68th Colorado General Assembly

Leaders

Members

See also
 List of Colorado state legislatures

References

External links
Official Colorado General Assembly Website  Includes links to state Constitution and statutes.

See also

Outline of Colorado
Index of Colorado-related articles
State of Colorado
Law and government of Colorado

68th
Bicameral legislatures
colorado
colorado
2011 in Colorado
2012 in Colorado